Judgment at Nuremberg is a 1961 American epic courtroom drama film directed and produced by Stanley Kramer, written by Abby Mann and starring Spencer Tracy, Burt Lancaster, Richard Widmark, Maximilian Schell, Werner Klemperer, Marlene Dietrich, Judy Garland, William Shatner, and Montgomery Clift. Set in Nuremberg, Germany, in 1948, the film depicts a fictionalized version of the Judges' Trial of 1947, one of the 12 U.S. Nuremberg Military Tribunals conducted before the U.S. military.

The film centers on a military tribunal led by Chief Trial Judge Dan Haywood (Tracy), before which four German judges and prosecutors (as compared to 16 defendants in the actual Judges' Trial) stand accused of crimes against humanity for their involvement in atrocities committed under the Nazi regime. The film deals with the Holocaust and non-combatant war crimes against a civilian population, the post-World War II situation and the geopolitical complexity of the actual Nuremberg Trials.

An earlier version of the story was broadcast as an episode of the same name of the television series Playhouse 90 in 1959. Schell and Klemperer played the same roles in both productions.

In 2013, Judgment at Nuremberg was selected for preservation in the United States National Film Registry by the Library of Congress as being "culturally, historically, or aesthetically significant".

Plot 
Judgment at Nuremberg centers on a military tribunal convened in Nuremberg, Germany, in which four German judges and prosecutors stand accused of crimes against humanity for their involvement in atrocities committed under the Nazi regime. 

Judge Dan Haywood (Spencer Tracy) is the chief judge of a three-judge panel of Allied jurists who will hear and decide the case against the defendants. Haywood is particularly interested in learning how the defendant Ernst Janning (Burt Lancaster) could have committed the atrocities he is accused of, including sentencing innocent people to death. 

Ernst Janning's character is a composite of three different judges, loosely based on the life of Franz Schlegelberger. Janning, it is revealed, is a well-educated and internationally respected jurist and legal scholar. 

Haywood seeks to understand how the German people could have been deaf and blind to the Nazi regime's crimes. In doing so, he befriends the widow (Marlene Dietrich) of a German general who had been executed by the Allies. He talks with others Germans who have varying perspectives on the war. 

Other characters the judge meets are US Army Captain Harrison Byers (William Shatner), who is assigned to assist the American judges hearing the case, and Irene Hoffmann (Judy Garland), who is afraid to provide testimony that may bolster the prosecution's case against the judges.

German defense attorney Hans Rolfe (Maximilian Schell) argues that the defendants were not the only ones to aid or ignore the Nazi regime. He claims the United States has committed acts just as bad or worse than the Nazis, such as US Supreme Court Justice Oliver Wendell Holmes Jr.'s support for the first eugenics practices (see Buck v. Bell); the German-Vatican Reichskonkordat of 1933, which the Nazi-dominated German government exploited as an implicit early foreign recognition of Nazi leadership; Joseph Stalin's part in the Nazi-Soviet Pact of 1939, which removed the last major obstacle to Germany's invasion and occupation of western Poland, initiating World War II; and the atomic bombings of Hiroshima and Nagasaki in the final stage of the war in August 1945.

Janning, meanwhile, testifies for the prosecution, admitting he is guilty of the alleged crime: condemning to death a Jewish man of "blood defilement" charges—namely, that the man had intimate relations with a 16-year-old Gentile girl—when he knew there was no evidence to support such a verdict. 

During his testimony, Janning explains that well-meaning people like himself supported  Adolf Hitler's anti-Semitic, racist policies out of patriotism while knowing it was wrong, and due to the effects of the post-World War I Treaty of Versailles. 

Haywood must weigh considerations of geopolitical expediency and ideals of justice. The trial is set against the background of the Berlin Blockade, and there is pressure to let the German defendants off lightly to gain German support in the growing Cold War against the Soviet Union. 

In the course of the movie, the reasons the three other defendants supported the Nazi regime becomes apparent: one was afraid, one was following orders, and one actually believed in Nazism.  All four defendants are found guilty and sentenced to life in prison.

Haywood visits Janning in his cell. Janning affirms to Haywood that his verdict was a just one, but asks him to believe that, regarding the mass murder of innocents, he never knew that it would come to that. Judge Haywood replies it came to that the first time Janning condemned a man he knew to be innocent.

Haywood departs; a title card informs the audience that of 99 defendants sentenced to prison terms in Nuremberg trials that took place in the American Zone, none were still serving a sentence when the film was released in 1961.

Cast

Production

Background 
The film's events relate principally to actions committed by the German state against its own racial, social, religious, and eugenic groupings within its borders "in the name of the law" (from the prosecution's opening statement in the film), from the time of Hitler's rise to power in 1933. The plot development and thematic treatment question the legitimacy of the social, political, and alleged legal foundations of these actions.

The real Judges' Trial focused on 16 judges and prosecutors who served before and during the Nazi regime in Germany, and who embraced and enforced laws—passively, actively, or both—that led to judicial acts of compulsory sexual sterilization and to the imprisonment and execution of people for their religions, racial or ethnic identities, political beliefs, and physical handicaps or disabilities.

A key thread in the film's plot involves a "race defilement" trial known as the Feldenstein case. In this fictionalized case, based on the real life Katzenberger Trial, an elderly Jewish man had been tried for having a "relationship" (sexual acts) with an Aryan (German) 16-year-old girl, an act that had been legally defined as a crime under the Nuremberg Laws, which had been enacted by the German Reichstag. Under these laws, the man was found guilty and was put to death in 1942. Using this and other examples, the movie explores individual conscience, collective guilt, and behavior during a time of widespread societal immorality.

The film is notable for its use of courtroom drama to illuminate individual perfidy and moral compromise in times of violent political upheaval; it was the first mainstream drama film to not shy from showing actual footage filmed by American and British soldiers after the liberation of the Nazi concentration camps. Shown in court by prosecuting attorney Colonel Tad Lawson (Richard Widmark), the scenes of huge piles of naked corpses laid out in rows and bulldozed into large pits were considered exceptionally graphic for a mainstream film of the time.

According to numerous sources, Tracy's climactic monologue was filmed in one take using multiple cameras. Clift had problems remembering his lines, so Kramer told him to do the best he could, correctly figuring that Clift's nervousness would be central to his character's mental state. (Clift was so eager to do the film that he worked just for expenses.) Lancaster speaks only three lines (none in the courtroom) until his lengthy outburst roughly 135 minutes into the film. Meanwhile, Garland was so happy to be working in a motion picture again after seven years away that it took her a while to get into the proper frame of mind to break down and cry.

Soundtrack
 "Lili Marleen"
 Music by Norbert Schultze (1938)
 Lyrics by Hans Leip (1915)
 "Liebeslied"
 Music by Ernest Gold
 Lyrics by Alfred Perry
 "Wenn wir marschieren"
 German folk song (ca. 1910)
 "Care for Me"
 By Ernest Gold
 "Notre amour ne peur"
 By Ernest Gold
 "Du, du liegst mir im Herzen"
 German folk song, arrangement by Ernest Gold
 "Piano Sonata No. 8 in C minor, Op. 13"
 By Ludwig van Beethoven

Reception
The reaction from the audience was reportedly subdued, with some applauding at the finish, but most of the Germans in attendance leaving in silence.

Kramer's film received positive reviews from critics and was lauded as a straight reconstruction of the famous trials of Nazi war criminals. The cast was especially praised, including Tracy, Lancaster, Schell, Clift, and Garland. The film's release was perfectly timed, as its subject coincided with the trial and conviction in Israel of Nazi SS officer Adolf Eichmann.

Bosley Crowther of The New York Times declared it "a powerful, persuasive film" with "a stirring, sobering message to the world". Variety wrote: "With the most painful pages of modern history as its bitter basis, Abby Mann's intelligent, thought-provoking screenplay is a grim reminder of man's responsibility to denounce grave evils of which he is aware. The lesson is carefully, tastefully and upliftingly told via Kramer's large-scale production." Harrison's Reports awarded its top grade of "Excellent", praising Kramer for employing "an ingenious device of fluid direction" and Spencer Tracy for "a performance of compelling substance".

Brendan Gill of The New Yorker called the film "a bold and, despite its great length, continuously exciting picture", which asks questions that "are among the biggest that can be asked and are no less fresh and thrilling for being thousands of years old". Gill added that the cast was so loaded with stars "that it occasionally threatens to turn into a judicial Grand Hotel. Luckily, they all work hard to stay inside their roles." Richard L. Coe of The Washington Post declared it "an extraordinary film, both in concept and handling. Those who see this at the Warner will recognize that the screen has been put to noble use."

The Monthly Film Bulletin of Britain dissented, writing in a mostly negative review that "this large-scale trial film undermines faith in its philosophical and historical merit by colouring the better part of its message with hackneyed court-room hysteria", explaining that "in a series of contrived scenes ... the point is hammered home right down to the last shock-cut. The same specious technique (zoom-lens shots and camera-circlings predominant) and showmanship turn the trial into little more than a travesty—notably in the melodramatic switch in the character of Janning."

The film grossed $6 million in the United States and $10 million in worldwide release.

The television network premiere of the film was shown on ABC on 7 March 1965; it was interrupted to show news footage of the violence on "Bloody Sunday" during the Selma to Montgomery marches. The juxtaposition of the film about Nazi atrocities and the news footage of violence against African-American people resulted in sympathy and greater support for the civil-rights cause.

Awards and nominations 

In June 2008, the American Film Institute revealed its "Ten Top Ten" after polling over 1,500 people from the creative community. Judgment at Nuremberg was acknowledged as the tenth best film in the courtroom drama genre. Additionally, the film had been nominated for AFI's 100 Years...100 Movies.

Release
Judgment at Nuremberg was released in American theatres on December 19, 1961.

CBS/Fox Video first released the film as a two-VHS cassette set in 1986. MGM re-released the VHS version in 1991, while the 1996 and 2001 reissues were part of the Vintage Classics and Screen Epics collection respectively. In addition, the special edition DVD was released on September 7, 2004.

Three Blu-ray versions of the film were also produced. A limited edition Blu-ray was released by Twilight Time on November 14, 2014. Kino Lorber re-released the Blu-ray as a standard release in 2018. The BFI released a 2-disc Blu-ray on January 20, 2020.

The Australian Blu-ray was released as part of The Hollywood Gold Series.

Adaptations 
In 1985, a Soviet stage adaptation of the film under the title Judgment was produced for Baltic House Festival Theatre, with Gennady Egorov as director.

In 2001, another stage adaptation of the film was produced for Broadway, starring Schell (this time in the role of Ernst Janning) and George Grizzard, with John Tillinger as director.

See also 
 German Concentration Camps Factual Survey, British and American army film of the camps
 List of Holocaust films
 Nuremberg Trials (a Soviet film on the trials)
 Trial films
 War crimes trials

Notes

References

External links 

 
 
 
  
 

1961 films
1961 drama films
1961 war films
American black-and-white films
American legal drama films
American courtroom films
American docudrama films
1960s English-language films
Films scored by Ernest Gold
Films about capital punishment
Films about lawyers
Films about Nazi Germany
Films based on television plays
Films directed by Stanley Kramer
Films featuring a Best Actor Academy Award-winning performance
Films featuring a Best Drama Actor Golden Globe winning performance
Films produced by Stanley Kramer
Films set in Germany
Films set in the 1940s
Films whose director won the Best Director Golden Globe
Films whose writer won the Best Adapted Screenplay Academy Award
Films about the aftermath of the Holocaust
Nuremberg in fiction
United Artists films
United States National Film Registry films
United States Nuremberg Military Tribunals
Nuremberg trials
World War II war crimes trials films
1960s American films